Antilochus is an Old World genus of true bugs in the family Pyrrhocoridae. The genus currently contains about 25 species, occurring in tropical Africa including Madagascar, South and Southeast Asia, the Malay Archipelago, and New Guinea. Antilochus are brightly coloured, usually red and black, and easily differentiated from other pyrrhocorids by the head being transversely depressed behind the eyes. They are often confused with bugs in the family Lygaeidae, but can be distinguished by the lack of ocelli on the head. Unlike most pyrrhocorids, Antilochus species are predatory, rather than herbivorous.

References 

Pentatomomorpha genera
Pyrrhocoridae